Reza Ghotbi (born 1938) is an Iranian engineer who headed National Iranian Radio and Television during Pahlavi dynasty. He left Iran and settled in the United States. During the time he attended Alborz High School, he developed ties to the Pan-Iranist Party.

References

 

1938 births
Living people
Pan-Iranist Party politicians
Rastakhiz Party politicians
Iranian nationalists
Exiles of the Iranian Revolution in the United States
Alborz High School alumni
20th-century Iranian engineers